Mátra Power Plant (Hungarian: Mátrai Erőmű), is a lignite fired power plant majority owned by MVM, the Hungarian state owned power company since 2019. 
It is located in the valley of the Mátra mountains, in Hungary. It has an installed electric power output of 950 MW, however, one 200 MW generator has been on permanent hiatus since January 2021. According to the latest government energy strategy, most of the existing lignite-fuelled units will be shut down in 2025, and a new 500 MW gas-fired unit will be added as well as up to 400 MW in solar power.

The Power Plant is the second largest in Hungary (after Paks Nuclear Power Plant), providing about 11% of the country's electricity production (and around 8% of its consumption) in 2020. The plant was once considered an important pillar in the national energy sector because it burns domestic fuel (lignite), unlike most other electricity plants in Hungary. However, the owner of the plant – the government – decided that the current lignite and gas based power generating unit is to be shut down in 2025 due to the aging generating equipment, the low quality of the local lignite, and the resulting environmental problems as well as the high emission costs.
In 2018, Mátrai Erőmű Zrt. produced approximately 7.9 million (metric) tonnes of lignite  but that decreased to a little under 5 million (metric) tonnes by 2021 according to the company's website.

History up to 2010

The power plant has been operating for more than 50 years – since 1969. The lignite is extracted from the opencast mines in Visonta and Bükkábrány. The original construction project was started in 1965, when a lignite field was discovered near Gyöngyös. Between 1986 and 1992, the plant was first modernized. The company was then privatized and, subsequently, a controlling interest was acquired by RWE in 1995.
The entire power station required an upgrade and retrofit program. As it emitted high levels of sulfur, flue-gas desulphurisation units were equipped to comply with EU emission standards. The units introduced were the first of their kind in the region, making the plant one of the most environmentally friendly coal-fired power plants in Europe.

Between 2005 and 2007, two of the 200 MW units were equipped with two topping gas turbines (TBT), each with a maximum power output of 33 MW, which improved efficiency. The performance of the coal block was increased by about 10%, which accounts for a total power output increase of about 100 MW. There were also plans for an additional block to be built, but in late 2010, the project was cancelled.

The chimney with a height of 203 meters is the 8th tallest buildings in Hungary.

References

External links 

  Website
  at Global Energy Monitor

Coal-fired power stations in Hungary
Natural gas-fired power stations in Hungary
Buildings and structures in Heves County
Energetický a průmyslový holding